Sir Edward Jonathan Davey  (born 25 December 1965) is a British politician who has served as Leader of the Liberal Democrats since 2020. He served in the Cameron–Clegg coalition as Secretary of State for Energy and Climate Change from 2012 to 2015 and as Deputy Leader to Jo Swinson in 2019. An "Orange Book" liberal, he has been the Member of Parliament (MP) for Kingston and Surbiton since 2017, and from 1997 to 2015.

Davey was born in Mansfield, Nottinghamshire, where he attended Nottingham High School. He then went on to study at Jesus College, Oxford, and Birkbeck, University of London. He was an economics researcher and financial analyst before being elected to the House of Commons. He served as a Liberal Democrat spokesperson to Charles Kennedy, Menzies Campbell and Nick Clegg from 2005 to 2010, in various portfolios including Education and Skills, Trade and Industry, and Foreign and Commonwealth Affairs.

In 2010, after the Liberal Democrats entered into a coalition government with the Conservative Party, Davey served as Parliamentary Under-Secretary of State for Employment Relations, Consumer and Postal Affairs from 2010 to 2012, and in David Cameron's Cabinet as Secretary of State for Energy and Climate Change from 2012 to 2015, following Chris Huhne's resignation. Davey focused on increasing competition in the energy market by removing barriers to entry for smaller companies, and streamlining the customer switching process. He also approved the construction of Hinkley Point C nuclear power station.

He lost his seat in the 2015 general election, but regained it in the snap election held two years later. He served as the Liberal Democrat Home Affairs spokesperson from 2017 to 2019. In July 2019, after the retirement of Vince Cable, Davey unsuccessfully ran against Jo Swinson in a leadership election. He was later appointed Liberal Democrat Treasury spokesperson and elected unopposed as Deputy leader of the Liberal Democrats. After Swinson lost her seat at the 2019 general election, Davey, while remaining Deputy Leader, served as Acting Leader alongside the Liberal Democrat Presidents Baroness Brinton and Mark Pack from December 2019 to August 2020. Davey stood in the 2020 leadership election, in which he defeated Layla Moran with 63.5% of the vote.

Early life
Edward Jonathan Davey was born in Mansfield, Nottinghamshire on 25 December 1965. His father John died when Davey was four years old, and his mother Nina Davey (née Stanbrook) died 11 years later, after which he was brought up by his maternal grandparents. After attending the private Nottingham High School where Davey was head boy in 1984, he attended Jesus College, Oxford, where he was awarded a first class BA degree in Philosophy, politics and economics in 1988. He was JCR President.

During his adolescence, he worked at Pork Farms pork pie factory and at Boots. In 1989, he became an economics researcher for the Liberal Democrats, principally to Alan Beith, the party's then-Treasury spokesman, whilst studying at Birkbeck College, London, for a master's degree (MSc) in Economics. He was closely involved in the development of Liberal Democrat policies such as an additional penny on income tax to fund  education, and central bank independence, for the 1992 general election. From 1993 to 1997, he worked in business forecasting and market analysis for management consultancy firm Omega Partners.

Parliamentary career (1997–2015)
Davey was elected to the House of Commons, at his first attempt, in the 1997 general election, where he defeated Richard Tracey, the sitting Conservative MP for the former constituency of Surbiton, with a majority of just 56 votes, and remained the seat's MP for 18 years. In his maiden speech, on 6 June 1997, he gave his support for the setting up of the London Assembly, but was against the idea of a directly elected Mayor of London; he also spoke of the effects governmental cuts were having on education delivery in the Royal Borough of Kingston upon Thames.

In 1998 he was the primary sponsor of an Early Day Motion supporting the repeal of the Greenwich Judgement, which prevents Local Authorities from giving their own residents priority access to school places.

In 2001, he opposed government proposals for restrictions on gambling machines, which he described as a "silly bit of nanny state politics".

In January 2003, Davey publicly backed local constituent and NHS whistleblower Ian Perkin, who alleged he had been sacked from his director of finance role for exposing statistics manipulation at St George's NHS healthcare trust. Davey condemned the NHS bureaucracy as "Stalinist" and called for an inquiry into Perkin's case, while personally meeting trust executives to discuss the case on behalf of Perkin.

In February 2003, Davey introduced the clause which repealed the prohibition of "promotion of homosexuality" under Section 28 of the Local Government Act 1988. The legislation was successfully repealed in March. He was one of the contributors to  The Orange Book (2004).

In 2006 Davey was one of eight Liberal Democrat MPs, including Jeremy Browne and Mark Oaten, who opposed a total ban on smoking in clubs and pubs. He called the ban "a bit too nanny state".

In an article for the Financial Times in 2007, Davey and LSE economist Tim Leunig proposed replacing the current system of local council planning permissions with community land auctions through sealed bids. They suggested that councils could take in tax the difference between the land owner's asking price and the highest bidder's offer, claiming this would stimulate development and the revenue then used to lower other taxation.

Lib Dem spokesperson
In Parliament, Davey was given a job immediately by Paddy (later Lord) Ashdown and became the party's spokesman on Treasury Affairs, adding the post of whip in 1998, and a third job to hold as the spokesman on London from 2000.

Davey was re-elected in the 2001 general election with an increased majority over former Conservative MP David Shaw. He joined the Liberal Democrat frontbench under Leader Charles Kennedy in the same year by becoming Liberal Democrat spokesperson for Treasury matters. In 2002, he became the Liberal Democrat spokesperson for the Office of the Deputy Prime Minister. He was appointed Liberal Democrat spokesperson for Education and Skills in 2005, before becoming Liberal Democrats spokesperson for Trade and Industry in March 2006. In December 2006, he succeeded Norman Lamb as Chief of Staff to Menzies Campbell, the new party leader. Davey was Chair of the party's Campaigns and Communications Committee. Following Nick Clegg's election as Leader of the Liberal Democrats, Davey was awarded the Foreign Affairs brief, and continued to retain his chairmanship of the party's Campaigns and Communications Committee.

On 26 February 2008, Davey was suspended from parliament for the day for ignoring a warning from the Deputy Speaker. He was protesting about the exclusion by the Speaker of a Liberal Democrat motion to debate and vote on whether the UK should have a referendum on staying in the EU.

At the 2009 Liberal Democrat conference, Davey caused controversy calling for dialogue with the Taliban, through declaring that it was "time for tea with the Taliban", a comment echoed by Malala Yousafzai four years later to the BBC.

Ministerial career (2010–2015)

Parliamentary Under-Secretary of State for Business (2010–2012)
Following the Conservative–Liberal Democrat coalition agreement, after the 2010 general election, Davey was appointed Parliamentary Under Secretary of State in the Department for Business, Innovation and Skills with responsibility for Employment Relations, Consumer and Postal Affairs. In addition, he held responsibilities for trade as a Minister for Trade Policy. As a Parliamentary Under Secretary, Davey led the establishment of an unofficial 'like-minded group for growth' ginger group within the European Union, convening several economically liberal European governments behind an agenda of deregulation, free trade, liberalisation of services and a digital single market. He was involved in the provisional application phase of the Free Trade Agreement between the EU and South Korea.

In January 2011, he faced protests by postal workers in his Kingston and Surbiton constituency for his role in the privatisation of Royal Mail. Also in 2011, Davey announced several reforms to the labour market, mainly aimed at improving labour market flexibility. These reforms included cuts to red tape and easing dismissal laws, and were accompanied by reviews from the Institute of Economic Affairs into compensation payments and the TUPE. Davey also announced that the government would abolish the default retirement age.

Secretary of State for Energy and Climate Change (2012–2015)

On 3 February 2012, following the resignation of Secretary of State for Energy and Climate Change Chris Huhne due to his prosecution for perverting the course of justice, Davey was appointed Energy Secretary, and appointed to the Privy Council on 8 February. As Secretary of State Davey also became a member of the National Security Council. In late 2012, the Daily Mail published an article questioning Davey's loyalty to Deputy Prime Minister and Leader of the Liberal Democrats Nick Clegg. Responding in an interview, Davey rejected the claims of the article, saying instead he thought Clegg was "the best leader" the Liberal Democrats had ever had and that he personally was a member of Clegg's "Praetorian Guard".

In 2013, Davey set up the Green Growth Group, bringing together environmental and climate ministers from across the European Union in an effort to promote growth, investment in renewable and nuclear energy, liberalisation of the European energy market, a global carbon market, trade in energy, carbon capture technology, energy efficiency, and competition. Domestically, Davey focused on increasing competition in the energy market by removing barriers to entry for smaller companies, and streamlining the customer switching process, declaring in 2013 that "competition works". He also approved the construction of Hinkley Point C nuclear power station. Abroad, Davey promoted investment in the British energy sector by foreign companies including from Japan, South Korea, and China, making significant diplomatic trips to the latter two countries in order to highlight investment opportunities.

In October 2013, during a BBC Newsnight segment on energy bills, in a controversy that was dubbed by some media "Jumpergate", Davey was asked by BBC presenter Jeremy Paxman whether or not he wore a jumper (to stay warm) at home, to which Davey replied that he did but stressed that competition and energy efficiency were the solutions to lowering energy bills. The following day, various media outlets reported that Davey had advised for people to wear jumpers at home to save on energy bills, although he had not. The controversy then spread when Prime Minister David Cameron's official spokesman told a reporter that people may wish to "consider" advice by charities to wrap up warmly, leading to media outlets reporting that Number 10 was also suggesting wearing jumpers to cut energy bills, with the supposed suggestion being seized upon by the opposition Labour Party. Number 10 later issued a statement rebutting the media reports. In April 2014, Davey called for the G7 to begin reduction of dependency on Russian energy following the Revolution of Dignity and commencement of the Russo-Ukrainian War. Davey argued the benefits of investment in onshore wind energy from companies such as Siemens was a key part of the push to reduce dependence on Russian energy, while "more diversified supplies of gas" including from the US and domestic shale gas would also help. In May 2014 at a meeting in Rome, G7 energy ministers including Davey agreed formally to a process for reducing dependency on Russian energy; "Putin has crossed a line", Davey declared.

Throughout and after the Cameron–Clegg coalition, Davey's ministerial career came under scrutiny from political figures and the media. On the right, Conservatives Nigel Lawson and Peter Lilley were critical of Davey's environmental stances, while journalist Christopher Booker, who does not accept the scientific consensus on anthropogenic global warming, questioned his policy on wind turbines, and he was lampooned by The Telegraph sketch writer Michael Deacon. He was also criticised by left-wing figures such as Green MP for Brighton Pavilion Caroline Lucas over for his support of fracking, and by the Leader of the Opposition and Leader of the Labour Party Ed Miliband for Davey's warning that Labour's price control policy would cause blackouts. Luxembourgish MEP and environmentalist Claude Turmes alleged in his 2017 book Energy Transformation that Davey's Green Growth Group was actually a front for British nuclear interests. Conversely, Davey's promotion to the role of Energy Secretary was hailed by The Economist, which viewed him favourably as a "pragmatic" and "free market liberal". In "The Liberal Democrats and supply-side economics", published in an issue of the Institute of Economic Affairs' Economic Affairs journal, Davey was identified as the Liberal Democrat who had achieved the most in terms of supply-side reforms. Conservative MP and former Chancellor of the Duchy of Lancaster and Minister of State for Government Policy Sir Oliver Letwin credited Davey and his aforementioned "like-minded" group of economically liberal governments as having helped to curb regulatory enthusiasm within the European Union.

Leading up to the 2015 general election, Davey was viewed by various sources as a potential successor to Liberal Democrat leader Nick Clegg. Political commentator Gary Gibbon speculated that due to Davey's association with the Orange Book wing of the party, the tenuousness of Danny Alexander's parliamentary seat, and David Laws' unwillingness, the role of "heir" would naturally fall to Davey.

Parliamentary career (2017–present)

2015 and 2017 elections
At the 2015 general election, Davey was defeated by Conservative candidate James Berry by 2,834 votes after the Liberal Democrat vote fell by over 15% in Kingston and Surbiton. This made him the first cabinet minister to lose their seat since 1997. Davey later told reporters he was "obviously disappointed" with his defeat, but said it had not been a total shock. "We knew it would be close - we had it written on our leaflets. But I don't think the voters did, he said. "When I was out canvassing today I had a man said to me: 'You'll be fine, Ed'. I wish I had a vote for all the people who told me I would be fine. The party is clearly paying some price for going into coalition with the Conservatives. We put the national interest above the party interest which was the right thing to do at the time. I have no regrets on that. I think we are seeing a national thing here. We have had a very bad night nationally."

At the end of 2015, he accepted a knighthood for 'political and public service' which was announced in the 2016 New Years Honours List. 
Davey regained Kingston and Surbiton for the Liberal Democrats at the 2017 general election, with a majority of 4,124 votes over Berry.

Return to Parliament
Upon returning to Parliament in 2017, Davey was considered a possible candidate for the Liberal Democrat leadership election following the resignation of Tim Farron. However, he ruled out standing over family concerns, but called on the Liberal Democrats to be "the party of reform" and "super-ambitious – just like radical centrists in Canada, France and the Netherlands". Davey was then the Liberal Democrat Treasury spokesperson, having previously served as Liberal Democrat Home Affairs spokesperson from 2017 to 2019.

He is the Chair of the All-Party Britain-Republic of Korea Parliamentary Group (APPG). He is also the Chair of the APPG on Charity Retail, the Vice Chair of the APPG for the Ahmadiyya Muslim Community, and the Vice Chair of the APPG on Land Value Capture.

Leader of the Liberal Democrats (2019–present)

2019 leadership bid
Following the 2019 European Parliament election, Liberal Democrat leader Sir Vince Cable announced his intention "to hand over a bigger, stronger party" to a new leader, triggering a party leadership contest. Davey announced his candidacy for the role on 30 May, stating his belief that action must be taken in Parliament to prevent a "no deal" Brexit, and highlighting his support for stronger action to limit global warming. Davey lost this race to Jo Swinson, with 36.9% of the vote to Swinson's 63.1%. On 3 September 2019, Davey was elected as Swinson's deputy leader.

2019 general election and acting co-leadership
Following Jo Swinson's resignation as a result of losing her seat in the December 2019 general election, due to his position as deputy leader, Davey became interim co-leader alongside the party president (at first Baroness Brinton, and then Mark Pack).

2020 leadership bid

In June 2020, acting leader Davey launched his bid to become leader saying that his "experience as a carer can help rebuild Britain after coronavirus". He proposed the establishment of a basic income to support carers, and said that the Liberal Democrats should be "the party of social care". Davey ruled out a formal electoral agreement with the Labour Party, but said that he would prioritise defeating the Conservatives, and ruled out working with the Conservatives following the next election. He proposed a plan to reduce carbon emissions from domestic flights to zero by 2030 through investment in research and technology. In a hustings event with Welsh members, he said that the 2021 Senedd election was a priority and he expected success for the Liberal Democrats.

Davey was one of two candidates running for leader in the Liberal Democrats leadership election, competing with Layla Moran. One recurring theme of the leadership campaign was Davey's record in the Conservative and Liberal Democrat coalition government, and the policies that government had enacted. Moran is considered to be more left-wing than Davey and representing a break from the coalition years. Alongside former leader Nick Clegg and many of the Lib Dems who served in the governing Conservative-Lib Dem coalition of 2010–2015, Davey is associated with the party's right-wing Orange Booker branch. The record of the coalition, which caused a decline in popularity of the Lib Dems after 2015, has been defended by Davey.

On 27 August, Davey won the leadership election with 42,756 votes, which translated to 63.5% of total votes. In his victory speech, Davey said that the Liberal Democrats must "wake up and smell the coffee" and "start listening" to ordinary people and those who "don't believe we share their values". He also stressed his experience in the coalition government, and his commitments to tackle climate change. Moran later congratulated Davey on Twitter, saying "I look forward to working with him to campaign for a better future for Britain."

Views
Davey identifies as a liberal politically, telling magazine Total Politics: "I personally think liberalism is the strongest political philosophy in the modern world. Socialism has failed. I think even social democracy, the watered down version which Labour sort of understand depending on which day of the week it is, is not very convincing, and I don’t really understand where the Conservatives are coming from because they have so many philosophies within one party. There’s no philosophy of the modern Conservative Party." He has said that he believes "in the free market and in competition", and during a parliamentary public bill committee debate in November 2010 argued in defence of privatisation, deregulation, and the private sector against Labour MP Gregg McClymont.

Davey also describes himself as a "strong free-trader", rejecting reciprocity in trade tariffs as "the classic protectionist argument". He believes Britain should be open to foreign investment, except for investment tainted by “smells that you have from Putin." He dismisses worries over foreign ownership and investment in the British economy such as that of Chinese and French companies' involvement in the British energy market. Davey describes himself as "an economist by trade."

He was a supporter of the coalition government, writing in a 2011 column for London newspaper Get West London that the coalition would "restore liberty to the people" and that "Labour's nanny state will be cut back" in reference to the coalition's policies on civil liberties. In 2012, Davey predicted the coalition government would be more pro-European Union than Tony Blair's Labour government, praising Conservative ministers and the then Prime Minister David Cameron for relations they had developed with European counterparts. Retrospectively, Davey said of the coalition in 2017: “I think the coalition government, when history looks at it, will go down as actually a pretty good government.” In 2017, Davey warned against a Conservative Party proposal for fines on large internet companies who fail to remove extremist and terrorist material from their platforms within 24 hours, which he claimed could lead to censorship if companies are forced to rush and pointed to Germany as an example of where this approach has the potential to lead to censorship. He thinks technology giants must not be treated as the "enemy" and accused the Conservatives of declaring an "all-out war" on the internet. Similarly he is critical of Conservative proposals to weaken encryption because, according to Davey, encryption is important for individual security and helping businesses to thrive.

In 2018, after the government's Investigatory Powers Act mass surveillance law was declared to be in breach of EU law, Davey commented that UK surveillance needed a “major overhaul” which puts “our freedoms and civil liberties at its very core” (Davey's party opposes the mass surveillance law and had voted against it). Since the 2000s, Davey has been vocal on the issue of detention without trial, in particular Guantanamo and Bagram, which he believed required transparency and formal investigation of torture allegations. He has opposed indefinite detention for illegal immigrants.

Davey is supportive of market solutions in the conventional energy sector, The Guardian describing him as a 'zealot' for markets. He has been highly critical of price controls such as those proposed by former Labour leader Ed Miliband; he considers them to be detrimental to competition and lowering prices for consumers. He has promoted removal of barriers to entry to encourage new entrants into the energy market; “We began with deregulation. This stimulated a doubling of smaller firms” he wrote of his policy as Energy Secretary in 2014. Additionally he welcomed the rise of consumer switching websites. He has also been in support of trade to import natural gas from countries including the USA and Qatar, and importation of green energy via new interconnectors from Norway and Ireland. He has, however, supported "properly designed and carefully targeted" short-term subsidies for some emerging green energy technologies in order to meet climate change targets.

When cutting green energy subsidies as Energy and Climate Change Secretary, Davey said he “tended to try and marketise the reduction so people were competing for any remaining subsidies” through Contracts for Difference (CfDs). I want the markets and technology development and innovation to decide what that mix is."

He has argued in favour of both nuclear power and shale gas fracking as potential energy sources, and natural gases as transitional fuels, though he has warned that there should not be an over-reliance on them. Davey previously had argued against nuclear power but in 2013 he urged fellow Lib Dem members to support nuclear power, stating, "I've changed my mind because of climate change."

Davey does not support the United Kingdom rejoining the European Union in the short term, in 2020 stating that the idea that people would want to consider re-joining the EU in two or three years time as "being for the birds". In January 2021 he clarified this position, stating that he is "determined the Liberal Democrats remain a pro-European party committed to the UK being members of the European Union again", adding that his party is "practical" about the matter.

In 2013, Davey supported Operation Shader, and the overthrow of Bashar al-Assad.

Following the death of Sarah Everard, Davey said that "Men have got to change" and suggested that we "educate boys and men to show more respect". In May 2021, alongside celebrities and other public figures, Davey was a signatory to an open letter from Stylist magazine which called on the government to address what it described as an "epidemic of male violence" by funding an "ongoing, high-profile, expert-informed awareness campaign on men’s violence against women and girls".

As a supporter of trans rights, Davey believes that trans women should be given the same rights as cisgender women, which he made clear in a series of interviews on the day that a report into violence against women, commissioned in the wake of the Everard affair, was published.

Davey criticised Boris Johnson after the North Shropshire by-election where a Lib Dem candidate, Helen Morgan overturned a Conservative majority of nearly 23,000 to win the seat.  Davey said it was a "watershed moment in our politics.  Millions of people are fed up with Boris Johnson and his failure to provide leadership throughout the pandemic and last night the voters of North Shropshire spoke for all of them."  Davey criticised Johnson further in May 2022 saying, "Boris Johnson is not fit to lead the country and he needs to go. At this time of national crisis, we can't afford to have a law-breaking prime minister."

Business appointments 
Davey took up several business appointments after leaving his role as Secretary of State for Energy and Climate Change in May 2015.
 Mongoose Energy appointed Davey as chairman in September 2015.
 Davey set up an independent consultancy in September 2015 to provide advice on energy and climate change.
 In January 2016 Davey was appointed as a part-time consultant to MHP Communications, the public relations and lobbying firm representing EDF Energy. Davey was criticised by press commentators for the potential conflict of interest between his previous role as Secretary of State for Energy and Climate Change and his role at MHP.  As Secretary of State Davey awarded EDF the contract to build a new nuclear plant at Hinkley Point in Somerset.
 Davey's appointment as Global Partner and non-Executive director of private equity investor Nord Engine Capital was announced in February 2016.
 In July 2016 he became non-paid patron of the Sustainable Futures Foundation, a charity promoting environmental sustainability for the public benefit.
 Until February 2021, Davey was on the advisory boards of the law firm Herbert Smith Freehills and of the fund manager NextEnergy Capital, which manages the listed company NextEnergy Solar Fund; he resigned both roles in the wake of the United Kingdom parliamentary second jobs controversy.

Personal life
In the summer of 2005 Davey married Emily Gasson, who was the Liberal Democrat candidate for North Dorset at the general election that year. Their first child, a son, was born in December 2007. Their son has speech difficulties, spurring Davey's interest in speech therapy. They live in Surbiton, London; Davey lived there before his election to Parliament in 1997. Emily had the number two position on the Lib Dem London-wide candidate list for the 2016 London Assembly elections, but was not elected. Emily then stood for election as a councillor for the three seat Norbiton Ward in 2018, as part of the Royal Borough of Kingston Council and topped the poll with 20% of the vote.

Davey speaks English, French, German and Spanish.

Honours
 In 1995, Davey won a Royal Humane Society bravery award and commendation from the Chief constable of the British Transport Police for rescuing a woman who had fallen onto the railway line in the face of an oncoming train at Clapham Junction railway station.
 In 2001 he was elected a Fellow of the Royal Society of Arts (FRSA).
 He was sworn in as a member of Her Majesty's Most Honourable Privy Council on 8 February 2012, giving him the honorific prefix "The Right Honourable" for life.
 Davey was knighted in the 2016 New Years Honours List for 'political and public service'.

Publications
Davey, Edward (2000), Making MPs Work For Our Money: Reforming Parliament's Role In Budget Scrutiny by 2000, Centre for Reform, 
Davey, Edward. "Liberalism and localism", Chapter 2 in The Orange Book: Reclaiming Liberalism by David Laws and Paul Marshall (contributions et al.), 2004, Profile Books, 
Davey, Edward; Hunter, Rebecca. People Who Help Us: Member of Parliament, 2004, Cherrytree Books,

See also
Liberal Democrat Conference
Liberal Democrat frontbench team

Notes

References

External links 

Profile at the Liberal Democrats
Edward Davey MP (BIS archive)

Profile: Edward Davey BBC News profile, 17 October 2007
Debrett's People of Today

|-

1965 births
Alumni of Jesus College, Oxford
Knights Bachelor
Leaders of the Liberal Democrats (UK)
Liberal Democrats (UK) MPs for English constituencies
Living people
Members of the Privy Council of the United Kingdom
Politicians awarded knighthoods
Politicians from Nottingham
UK MPs 1997–2001
UK MPs 2001–2005
UK MPs 2005–2010
UK MPs 2010–2015
UK MPs 2017–2019
UK MPs 2019–present